Vaanam Kottattum is a 2020 Indian Tamil-language drama film directed by Dhana, who co-wrote the film with Mani Ratnam. The film has an ensemble cast of R. Sarathkumar, Vikram Prabhu, Raadhika Sarathkumar and Aishwarya Rajesh, with Shanthanu Bhagyaraj, Madonna Sebastian, Nandha, Amitash Pradhan and others in supporting roles. The film is produced by Mani Ratnam for Madras Talkies, with the latter also credited for co-writing the film's script. The film  released on 7 February 2020.

Plot

As a young boy, Selva sees his paternal uncle Velusaamy Thevar being stabbed by someone. Selva brings his father Bose Kaalai, and they all take the uncle to the hospital. Bose is infuriated that his enemies did this to prevent his brother from contesting in elections. He goes to their home and kills two people who were the reason behind his brother's condition. The murder is witnessed by the young Baskaran, son of one of the killed by Bose. Bose's wife Chandra is shocked on hearing that he killed two people. Bose is arrested but hopes that he can clear the charge and come out. His opponents win the elections out of sympathy votes, and Bose is jailed for 16 years. Chandra is disappointed by her husband's irresponsible behavior and wishes that her son should not become like his father. She leaves her in-laws' family and moves to Chennai with her son Selva and daughter Mangai.

Chandra struggles a lot with adolescent Selva who is so adamant and thug attitude. Bose's elder brother Velusaamy supports his brother's family. Selva and Mangai are now adults, but Selva's attitude has not changed. Selva takes up a job as a call taxi driver, and Mangai is a law college student. She shares a good friendship with her friend Ramanathan. Selva drives a couple in his taxi and sees them fighting over the breakup of the couple. The girl threatens her lover to marry her or she will commit suicide by jumping from the bridge into the lake. The scared lover tries to stop her, but the girl pushes him to the lake. Selva pushes the girl into the lake to save the boy but finds that both cannot swim. He also jumps and saves them. Selva introduces himself to the girl named Preetha and her father George in the hospital.

Velusaamy asks Selva to accompany him to a wholesale plantain market to settle accounts with one of the buyers, Paramasivan. Paramasivan tries to cheat Velusaamy, but Selva somehow gets the due money back. He sees potential in wholesale plantain sales and starts a new business of plantain wholesale. They approach the family of the victim killed by Bose to supply plantains, to which they reluctantly agree to. Selva meets George and understands that Preetha's family is heavily indebted. Selva and Mangai approach a big head in plantain wholesale, Reddy, for the supply of Andhra plantains. Reddy is impressed by Selva's confident approach and agrees to do business with him provided that he secures a shop in the Koyambedu market. Mangai intelligently accomplishes the task.. They win a place in the Koyembedu market, and Mangai befriends Reddy's son Kalyan.

Meanwhile, Bose is released from prison after 16 years. Selva and Mangai feel bad about their father as he was in jail and this will affect the respect in the neighborhood. Chandra gets angry about her children's attitude and supports her husband. Bose interferes in Selva's business without his consent, which irritates Selva. The plantain supplier, who belongs to the family of the person killed by Bose, refuses to continue business with Selva as Bose returned from prison. Hence the supply for plantains stop. Bose disappears from home for three days with Chandra's jewels. Mangai and Selva think that he ran away with the jewels, but Bose returns bringing a truck of golden fruits (plantain variety) procured from Bangalore. Selva is irked by the golden fruits and supplies them free of cost as they may rot at any time. He gets angry that Bose wasted the money. This ensues a fight between Bose and Selva, and Bose angrily leaves home.

Bose also insults Preetha that she flirted with his son and made him give a bank guarantee for two crores. He misunderstands the relation between Mangai and Kalyan and warns him to stay away from his daughter. This angers Selva and Mangai, but they keep quiet for their mother. Selva finds that the variety of the golden fruit is in much demand and becomes delighted about the orders he gets. Reddy comes to Selva's home to ask Mangai's hand for marriage with his son, but Mangai declares that she loves her childhood friend Ramanathan. Reddy happily agrees to it and blesses her.

Meanwhile, Baskaran has been following Bose the moment he got released from jail. His twin brother Natrayan warns him to stay away from Bose's family as killing him is not a solution; rather, his future will get spoiled. Baskaran accidents Bose's bike, and Bose is injured and hospitalized. Selva sees Baskaran running away from the hospital and chases him but in vain. Meanwhile, George passes away. Selva consoles Preetha, and they start a relationship. Bose is heartbroken that his children do not accept him in their life and leaves to his brother's house. He finds the victim's family went to Chennai in search of him. Scared that they might harm his family, Bose rushes to Chennai. Baskaran tricks Selva posing as Natrayan and pretends to warn that he has come to save his family from Baskaran. Selva gets kidnapped by Baskaran. Bose arrives on time and rescues Selva. He tells Baskaran that jail is hell and that he should not waste his life killing Bose. If he still wants to take revenge, he can go ahead. Baskaran changes his mind.

The film ends with Bose and Chandra celebrating their 60th anniversary in their hometown with the reconciled Selva, Mangai, and the entire family.

Cast

 Sarathkumar as Bose Kaalai
 Vikram Prabhu as Selva
 Raadhika Sarathkumar as Chandra
 Aishwarya Rajesh as Mangai
 Shanthanu Bhagyaraj as Ramanathan
 Madonna Sebastian as Preetha George
 Nandha as twins Baskaran and Natrayan
 Amitash Pradhan as Kalyan Reddy
 Balaji Sakthivel as Velusaamy Thevar, Bose Kaalai's brother
 Madhusudhan Rao as Reddy
 Ram C as Prathap
 M. J. Shriram as George, Preetha's father
 Sreeja Ravi as Velumani, Ramanathan's mother
 "Murattu Pandian" Baboos as Paramasivan
 Supergood Subramani
 Aroul D. Shankar
 Master Raghavan as young Selva

Production
Mani Ratnam finalised plans to produce a film for Madras Talkies by his assistant director Dhana Sekaran in late 2018. The story of the film was conceived by Mani Ratnam during a recce during the pre-production stages of O Kadhal Kanmani (2015). He had written a story based on the lives of real characters from Theni, which his assistant Dhana had recollected from his years growing up in the hill town. Mani Ratnam chose to eventually prioritise other directorial ventures, but agreed to produce the script with Dhana as director, owing to his familiarity with the characters. Dhana initially considered naming the film either Two Brothers or Brother Sister, but Mani Ratnam suggested the title of Vaanam Kottattum, a title he had earlier considered for his O Kadhal Kanmani and Kaatru Veliyidai (2017).

The first crew member to be publicly announced was music composer Govind Vasantha, who accepted to work on the film following negotiations in early November 2018. G. V. Prakash Kumar was signed to play the lead role, while Aishwarya Rajesh joined the cast shortly after to play the sister of Prakash Kumar's character. Vikram Prabhu replaced Prakash Kumar during March 2019, while Madonna Sebastian was subsequently cast opposite him. Actors Sarathkumar and Raadhika Sarathkumar were then drafted in to play the parents of Vikram Prabhu's character.

Prior to the start of the shoot, actors Nandha Durairaj, Shanthanu Bhagyaraj and Amitash Pradhan were also added to the cast. Director Balaji Sakthivel joined the film's cast in August 2019 to portray a supporting role, marking an extended foray into acting following his role in Asuran (2019). Preetha Jayaraman was signed as the film's cinematographer, while Eka Lakhani joined as the costume designer. Despite finishing work on two songs, Govind Vasantha opted out of the film owing to a production delay and was replaced by playback singer Sid Sriram, who made his debut as a music composer through the project.

The film began production on 19 July 2019 and was continued throughout August. Scenes and a montage song titled "Business" featuring Vikram Prabhu was filmed near Jerusalem College of Engineering, Chennai. Further scenes were filmed at home in Triplicane, with Mani Ratnam also often visiting the shoot.

During the first look poster release, the rest of the technicians working on the film was revealed, including K. Kathir as art director, debutant Sangathamizhan E. as film editor, Viji Sathish as choreographer, and "Stunner" Sam as stunt choreographer.

Music

The music for the film was composed by singer Sid Sriram, making his debut as a film composer. In addition to him singing most of the songs in this movie (except for the song, "Mannava"), he also composed the film's background score, alongside music director K. The album features six songs (with four of them were previously being released as singles), in which the lyrics for all the songs are written by Siva Ananth, who had previously co-written the script with Mani Ratnam for Chekka Chivantha Vaanam.

The first single track, "Kannu Thangom" was released on 15 November 2019. The second single track, "Easy Come Easy Go" was released on 20 November 2019. The third single track, "Poova Thalaiyaa" was released on 15 January 2020, coinciding with Pongal celebration. The fourth single track, "En Uyir Kaatre" was released on 20 January 2020.

The film's album was released at the music and trailer launch event which held on 23 January 2020. In addition, the album was made available immediately through music streaming platforms.

Govind Vasantha was signed in to compose music for the film. However, despite finishing work on two songs, Govind Vasantha opted out of the film owing to a production delay and was replaced by playback singer Sid Sriram, who made his debut as a music composer through the project.

Distribution 
YNOTX was announced as the film's distribution partner on 6 January 2020.

Release 
The film was originally scheduled to be released on 31 January 2020, was released on 7 February 2020.

References

External links 
 

2020 films
2020s Tamil-language films
Films about siblings
Indian drama films
Films scored by K (composer)
Films scored by Sid Sriram
2020 drama films